Mitch Dane is an American record producer, musician, and songwriter who resides in Nashville. His work with artists include Jars of Clay, JJ Heller, Brandon Heath, Jetty Rae, Sonia Leigh, The Blind Boys of Alabama, The Young Fables, Ole Lonesome, Swearingen and Kelli,  Kenny Foster and many others. He was awarded a Grammy for his work on Jars of Clay's 11th Hour, and nominated for Grammys for his work on four other albums. Dane also received ASCAP's "Most Played Song" award for "Nothing Without You" co-written with Bebo Norman. He owns the recording studio Sputnik Sound with Vance Powell.

Personal life
Dane grew up in Southeast Missouri (Cape Girardeau), where he spent his childhood making playhouses and treehouses. At age 14, Dane was involved in a motorcycle accident, rendering him clinically dead for several minutes until his was miraculously revived. His esophagus, trachea and vocal cords were injured in the accident, prohibiting him from speaking for two years, a period Dane defines as when he "learned to really listen". His injuries required 33 surgeries, one of which removed a vocal chord, contributing to his distinct voice. Dane worked the story of his accident into his musical performances over the next 15 years until he pivoted and began audio engineering.

Dane is married with two children and has lived in Nashville since 1989.

Musical Influences
As a producer, Dane has been cited as saying "I like to collect the best aspects of every genre of music and bring them together in hybrid productions". Citing his childhood affinity for building treehouses, Dane states that he took the same approach when designing his studio; a place for people to be comfortable and to hang out. His demeanor has been described as "calm and focused".

Selected Production credits
As of December 2018 Mitch Dane has produced or engineered over 275 projects. Below is a selection of his production credits:

References

American producers
Record producers from Missouri
Living people
Grammy Award winners
1967 births